Thunder Creek was a provincial electoral district for the Legislative Assembly of Saskatchewan, Canada. Originally created for the 3rd Saskatchewan general election in 1912 and abolished in 1938, this constituency was reconstituted for the 18th Saskatchewan general election in 1975. It was abolished a second time in 2016, with most of the constituency being re-distributed into the new electoral district of Lumsden-Morse.

Communities in the district included the towns of Lumsden, Caronport, Regina Beach, Morse, Craik and Herbert; and the villages of Central Butte, Chaplin, Elbow, Mortlach, Riverhurst, Waldeck, Eyebrow and Bethune.

Members of the Legislative Assembly

Election results

|-

 
|NDP
|Ryan McDonald
|align="right"|1,304
|align="right"|17.54%
|align="right"|-5.62

|- bgcolor="white"
!align="left" colspan=3|Total
!align="right"|7,436
!align="right"|100.00%
!align="right"|

|-

 
|NDP
|Larry Hall
|align="right"|1,997
|align="right"|23.16%
|align="right"|-7.65

 
|Prog. Conservative
|Richard Swenson
|align="right"|295
|align="right"|3.42%
|align="right"|-

|- bgcolor="white"
!align="left" colspan=3|Total
!align="right"|8,624
!align="right"|100.00%
!align="right"|

|-

 
|NDP
|Ivan Costley
|align="right"|1,496
|align="right"|19.96%
|align="right"|-10.90
|- bgcolor="white"
!align="left" colspan=3|Total
!align="right"|7,496
!align="right"|100.00%
!align="right"|

|-

 
|Prog. Conservative
|Janet Day
|align="right"|2,414
|align="right"|31.65%
|align="right"|-10.96
 
|NDP
|Lewis Draper
|align="right"|2,353
|align="right"|30.86%
|align="right"|-1.73
|- bgcolor="white"
!align="left" colspan=3|Total
!align="right"|7,626
!align="right"|100.00%
!align="right"|

|-
 
| style="width: 130px"|Progressive Conservative
|Richard Swenson
|align="right"|2,929
|align="right"|42.61%
|align="right"|-10.91
 
|NDP
|Ron Bishoff
|align="right"|2,240
|align="right"|32.59%
|align="right"|+6.15

 
|Independent
|Dwayne McBride
|align="right"|66
|align="right"|0.96%
|align="right"|–
|- bgcolor="white"
!align="left" colspan=3|Total
!align="right"|6,874
!align="right"|100.00%
!align="right"|

|-
 
| style="width: 130px"|Progressive Conservative
|Richard Swenson
|align="right"|3,773
|align="right"|53.52%
|align="right"|+11.03
 
|NDP
|Betty Payne
|align="right"|1,864
|align="right"|26.44%
|align="right"|-1.09

|- bgcolor="white"
!align="left" colspan=3|Total
!align="right"|7,050
!align="right"|100.00%
!align="right"|

|-
 
| style="width: 130px"|Progressive Conservative
|Richard Swenson
|align="right"|2,670
|align="right"|42.49%
|align="right"|–
 
|NDP
|Betty Payne
|align="right"|1,730
|align="right"|27.53%
|align="right"|–

|- bgcolor="white"
!align="left" colspan=3|Total
!align="right"|6,284
!align="right"|100.00%
!align="right"|

References

External links 
Website of the Legislative Assembly of Saskatchewan
Elections Saskatchewan: Official Results of the 2007 Provincial Election By Electoral District
Elections Saskatchewan - Official Results of the 2010 Provincial Election
Saskatchewan Archives Board – Saskatchewan Election Results By Electoral Division

Former provincial electoral districts of Saskatchewan